During the 2014-15 season, the Guildford Lightning, participated in the English Women's Premier Ice Hockey League.

Team Roster

Standings

League standings

Schedule And Results

External links
Official Guildford Lightning website

References

Guildford
Guildford Lightning
Guildford Lightning season